Geoffrey Nevill (October 5, 1843 - February 10, 1885) was an English malacologist who worked in the Indian Museum in Kolkata. He was the younger brother of Hugh Nevill, British civil servant in Sri Lanka.

Nevill was born in Holloway, the second son of William Nevill, a geologist who lived for sometime in Godalming. He was educated at H.D. Heatley's school in Brighton and also spent some time in Bonn at the home of Dr F.H. Troschel, professor of zoology. He took an early interest in molluscs and made collections from around his home at Godalming and also from Germany. Most of these were deposited in the Indian Museum at Calcutta. He then tried to work with his father but poor health led to being sent off to warmer climates and he travelled around South Africa, Mauritius, and Bourbon, continuing his collections. He stayed in the Seychelles from 1868 for some time before going to Calcutta where he worked at the Indian Museum. His health declined and he moved to Europe, with some time spent in looking at the molluscs around lake Como. He died in Davos Platz, Switzerland, his brother Hugh also collected and researched molluscs from India.Some of Geoffrey's material is in the National Museum of Wales.

The World Register of Marine Species lists 51 marine species named by Nevill, many of which were named together with his brother as "Nevill & Nevill".

Published works
Nevill's major work was the two part "Hand list of Mollusca in the Indian Museum", Calcutta (1878-1884). Part 1 Part 2

References

1843 births
1885 deaths
British malacologists